Whangamarino was a flag station on the North Island Main Trunk line, in the Waikato District of New Zealand,  south of Auckland.

History 
The station opened on 13 August 1877.

Track doubling to ease congestion was authorised in 1914, but work was delayed by the war and the line remains single. A scheme to use spoil from the Auckland City Rail Link to double the track has been considered.

Incident 
Three passengers in a sleeping car died in May 1914, when an express from Wellington passed a broken signal in fog and crashed into a goods train. A porter was charged with manslaughter, but acquitted.

References 

Railway stations in New Zealand
Buildings and structures in Waikato
Rail transport in Waikato
Waikato District
Railway stations opened in 1877
Railway stations closed in 1978
1877 establishments in New Zealand